Gian Giordano Orsini, IV Lord of Bracciano (Bracciano,  1460 - Vicovaro, 1517) was an Italian nobleman and condottiero. He married Felice della Rovere and was the son-in-law of Pope Julius II.

Biography 
Gian Giordano Orsini was born around 1460 in Bracciano. He was the son of Gentile Virginio Orsini, III Lord of Bracciano, and of his wife Isabella Orsini.

In 1482 he was captain of the papal army of Sixtus IV against the Duke of Calabria Alfonso II of Naples. He participated in the Battle of Campomorto alongside the famous Roberto Malatesta.

In 1495 he was captain of King Charles VIII of France against the Kingdom of Naples of King Ferrante and his son Alfonso. He was captured and released only after two years. In this period, some possessions of the Orsini family were assigned to the rival Colonna family.

Once free, he escaped an attack ordered by the Colonnas and took refuge in France, at the court of Louis XII.

In 1511 his father-in-law, Pope Julius II, negotiated a peace with the Colonnas and recalled Gian Giordano to Italy.

He died in Vicovaro in 1517.

Issue 
Gian Giordano Orsini married twice.

In 1486 he married Maria Cecilia of Aragon-Naples, an illegitimate daughter of King Ferrante of Naples.

They had one son and two daughters:

 Napoleon (d. 1553), condottiero.
 Francesca, who married Giovanni Cardona.
 Carlotta, who married Giantommaso Pico della Mirandola. They had three sons, Girolamo, Virginio and Giovanni Antonio, and a daughter, Maddalena.

In 1506 he married Felice della Rovere, illegitimate daughter of Cardinal Giuliano della Rovere (from 1513 Pope Julius II)

They had three sons and two daughters:    

 Giulia Orsini (1507 - 1537). She married Pietro Antonio Sanseverino, IV prince of Bisignano, and had two daughters, Eleonora "Dianora", poetess and wife of Ferdinando de Alarcón y Mendoza; and Felicia, who married Antonio Orsini, V Duke of Gravina.
 Giulio Orsini (1508 - 1508). He lived only few months.
 Francesco Orsini (1512 - 1544 or after). Bishop of Tricarico between 1539 and 1544.
 Girolamo Orsini (1513 - 1545), V Lord of Bracciano. He married Francesca Sforza di Santa Fiore, daughter of Bosio II Sforza, XI Count of Santa Fiora, and his wife Costanza Farnese. They had a daughter, Felicia (1535 - 1596), who married Marcantonio II Colonna and had with him seven children, and a son, Paolo Giordano I Orsini, who married first Isabella de' Medici and had with her two daughters, Francesca Eleonora and Isabella, and a son, Virginio; and later married Vittoria Accoramboni, without issue.
 Clarice Orsini (1514 - before 1562). She married Luigi Carafa della Stadera and had a son, Antonio.

Honours 
 Order of the Ermine - 1487
 Order of Saint Michael

References

Sources 

 
 Pompeo Litta, Orsini di Roma, in Famiglie celebri italiane, Torino, 1846.

1517 deaths
Nobility from Rome
Italian nobility
Orsini family
Italian Renaissance people
15th-century Italian people